Mystery (alternatively Riddle) is the translated title of a 1994 Mandarin album 迷 recorded by Chinese singer Faye Wong as 'Wong Ching Man' when she was based in Hong Kong.

Although she had included a few Mandarin Chinese songs in her 1993 albums No Regrets and 100,000 Whys, Mystery was her first album recorded entirely in Mandarin rather than the Hong Kong majority dialect of Cantonese. The first track "I'm Willing" (or "I Do") was an instant hit single, and the album brought Wong to fame across the region of East Asia. The track "Cold War" is a cover of Tori Amos's "Silent All These Years"; Wong had already scored a hit with her Cantonese version of this song, which had been included in her 1993 album 100,000 Whys.

Despite the inclusion of Mandarin versions of that and other Cantonese songs, Mystery was a huge hit, selling over 800,000 in Taiwan alone.

Track listing

Notes

"Wo Yuanyi"
The first track "Wo Yuanyi" was covered in English by Lene Marlin in 2005, in Japanese by JAYWALK in 2002, and in Korean by Seomoon Tak in 2004. It was featured in the following films: Loving Him (2002), Just Another Pandora's Box (2010), Don't Go Breaking My Heart (2011), and I Do (2012), among others.

References

1994 albums
Faye Wong albums
Cinepoly Records albums
Mandopop albums